is a former Japanese football player.

Club statistics

References

External links

1985 births
Living people
Association football people from Saitama Prefecture
Japanese footballers
J1 League players
J2 League players
Urawa Red Diamonds players
Ehime FC players
Association football midfielders